Lethe anthedon, the northern pearly-eye, is a species of butterfly of the subfamily Satyrinae in the family Nymphalidae. It is found in North America, from central Saskatchewan and eastern Nebraska east to Nova Scotia, south to central Alabama and Mississippi.

The MONA or Hodges number for Lethe anthedon is 4568.1.

Description
The wingspan is 1 1/2 to 2 1/2 inches (43–67 mm.) The upperside is brown with dark eyespots and the underside is brown. Adults feed on dung, fungi, carrion and sap from willows, poplars, and birches.

The larvae feed on various grasses, including Leersia virginica, Erianthus species, Muhlenbergia species, bearded shortgrass (Brachyelytrum erectum), Uniola latifolia, bottlebrush grass (Hystrix patula), and false melic grass (Schizachne purpurascens). The host plants of a northern population include sedges (Carex species).

The species overwinters in the larval stage.

Gallery

Subspecies
 Lethe anthedon anthedon (A. Clark, 1936)
 Lethe anthedon borealis (A. Clark, 1936)

Similar species
Satyrodes appalachia / Lethe appalachia (R. L. Chermock, 1947) – Appalachian brown
Satyrodes eurydice [Lethe eurydice] (Linnaeus, 1763) – eyed brown

References

Further reading

 

Satyrini
Butterflies described in 1936